Religion and American Culture is a biannual academic journal published by University of California Press on behalf of the Center for the Study of Religion and American Culture (Indiana University Purdue University at Indianapolis). The journal was established in 1991 and covers the nature, terms, and dynamics of religion in America, and the interplay between religion and other spheres of American culture.

Abstracting and indexing 
The journal is abstracted and indexed in:

See also 
 List of theological journals

External links 
 
 Center for the Study of Religion and American Culture

Religious studies journals
University of California Press academic journals
Publications established in 1991
Biannual journals
English-language journals
1991 establishments in the United States
Cambridge University Press academic journals